Percy George Reddick  (9 November 1896 – 17 March 1978)  was Archdeacon of Bristol  from 1950 to 1967.

Reddick served with the King's Royal Rifles during World War I. He was at Oxford University from 1919 to 1923: three years at St Edmund Hall and one at  Wycliffe Hall. 
After curacies in Southfields and Sydenham  he held  incumbencies, Herne Hill and Downend. He was Bristol Diocesan Secretary from 1943 until his Archdeacon’s appointment.

References

1896 births
Alumni of St Edmund Hall, Oxford
Alumni of Wycliffe Hall, Oxford
King's Royal Rifle Corps officers
Archdeacons of Bristol
1978 deaths